X.Org may refer to:

 X.Org Server, the reference implementation of X developed by the Foundation
 X.Org Foundation, a community-based foundation which took over X stewardship in 2004
 X.Org, the organisation in charge of X standards from 1999, as part of The Open Group

See also
 X Window System, a windowing system for bitmap displays, common on UNIX-like computer operating systems
 X.com, an online bank founded by Elon Musk
 X-COM, a science fiction video game franchise